Warren on the Weekend was a syndicated Canadian talk radio program hosted by Peter Warren from 1998 to 2006. It was broadcast on several AM radio stations, mainly in Western Canada, on Saturdays and Sundays from 11 a.m. to 2 p.m. Pacific Time on the Corus Radio Network. Warren left the show in March 2006, to devote his efforts to his work as an investigative journalist. The final edition of Warren on the Weekend was broadcast on March 5, 2006.

Notes
 BC Business Magazine profile
 Globe and Mail article about his retirement from radio
 Biographical sketch

External links
 Peter Warren's web site

Canadian talk radio programs
Syndicated Canadian radio programs